The 2006 European Tour was the 35th golf season since the European Tour officially began in 1972. 

The season began with five events in late 2005 and consisted of 47 official money events, equalling the record set the previous year. This included the four major championships and three World Golf Championships, which are also sanctioned by the PGA Tour. 27 events took place in Europe, 12 in Asia, five in the United States, two in South Africa and one in Australia. Total prize money exceeded €117 million, including nearly €40 million in the major championships and WGC events.

The Order of Merit race came down to the last few shots of the final tournament, and was won by Pádraig Harrington for the first time. He was the first Irishman to top the Order of Merit since the official beginning of the tour. The Player of the Year award was given to Order of Merit runner up Paul Casey of England and the Sir Henry Cotton Rookie of the Year was Marc Warren of Scotland.

Major tournaments

For a summary of the major tournaments and events of 2006, including the major championships and the World Golf Championships, see 2006 in golf.

Changes for 2006
Changes from the 2005 season included four new tournaments, the HSBC Champions in China, the Abu Dhabi Golf Championship, the Austrian Open, which returned to the European Tour schedule for the first time since 1996, and the Royal Trophy, a team event contested between teams from Europe and Asia. In addition, there were two editions of the Volvo China Open and the Russian Open became a full European Tour event having previously been a dual-ranking event with the Challenge Tour. The German Masters, the Heineken Classic, and the Abama Open de Canarias were lost from the tour schedule, as was the New Zealand Open which was held later in the year as part of the 2007 season.

Schedule
The following table lists official events during the 2006 season.

Unofficial events
The following events were sanctioned by the European Tour, but did not carry official money, nor were wins official.

Order of Merit
The Order of Merit was based on prize money won during the season, calculated in Euros.

Awards

See also
2006 in golf
2006 Challenge Tour
2006 European Seniors Tour
2006 PGA Tour
List of golfers with most European Tour wins

Notes

References

External links
2006 season results on the PGA European Tour website
2006 Order of Merit on the PGA European Tour website

European Tour seasons
European Tour